Theochila is a Neotropical genus of butterflies in the family Pieridae.

Species
Theochila maenacte (Boisduval, 1836)

References

Pierini
Pieridae of South America
Pieridae genera